Fayetteville is the second-largest city in Arkansas, the county seat of Washington County, and the biggest city in Northwest Arkansas.  The city is on the outskirts of the Boston Mountains, deep within the Ozarks.  Known as Washington until 1829, the city was named after Fayetteville, Tennessee, from which many of the settlers had come.  It was incorporated on November 3, 1836, and was rechartered in 1867.  Fayetteville is included in the three-county Northwest Arkansas Metropolitan Statistical Area, which is ranked 102nd in terms of population in the United States with 560,709 in 2021 according to the United States Census Bureau.  The city had a population of 98,203 in 2022.

Fayetteville is home to the University of Arkansas, the state's flagship university.  When classes are in session, thousands of students on campus change up the pace of the city.  Thousands of Arkansas Razorbacks alumni and fans travel to Fayetteville to attend football, basketball, and baseball games.  The city of Fayetteville is colloquially known as the "Track Capital of the World" due to the success and prestige of the University of Arkansas cross country and track & field programs. The University's men's cross country and track and field programs have won a combined 41 national championships to date with the women's teams adding 5 national championships since 2015.

The city is the first in America to be awarded the designation of "Bike City" by the Union Cycliste Internationale (UCI), the world governing body of cycling. It was given the title in 2021 due to it not only hosting major UCI cycling events, but also its work in developing cycling through programs and infrastructure.

The city hosts the Walmart Shareholders Meetings each year at the Bud Walton Arena.

History

Settlement through Antebellum period

In 1828, George McGarrah settled at Big Spring with his family on the modern day corner of Spring and Willow, founding the town of Washington, and starting work on the courthouse. On October 17, Washington County was established, Washington chosen as the county seat. The Washington Courthouse was finished in 1829, and also contained the post office. Later in the year Postmaster Larkin Newton changed the name to the Fayetteville Courthouse, to avoid confusing with Washington, Hempstead County. Two councilmen selected to name the city were from Fayetteville, Tennessee, which was itself named for Fayetteville, North Carolina (where some of its earliest residents had lived before moving to Tennessee).  That original Fayetteville was named for General Lafayette, a French general who helped the colonies gain independence in the American Revolutionary War.

The first store in Fayetteville was opened by John Nye in a small building constructed by James Holmsley. In 1832 David Walker, Chief Justice of the Arkansas supreme court, built a double log cabin on what is now Center Street. In 1822 Archibald Yell, the second Governor of Arkansas, built a house and called it "Waxhaw" after his home in North Carolina. This was on the outskirts of town then but now is a street named after him that connects College and School streets. The first hotels were the Burnside House and the Onstott House. Fayetteville was incorporated as a town on November 3, 1836.

In 1859, a city charter was obtained from the Legislature. During the Civil War the municipal government was suspended and was not reinstated until 1867. P.V. Rhea was the president of the town trustees in 1836; J.W. Walker was the first mayor under the charter of 1859, and M.L. Harrison was the first mayor when the government was reorganized in 1867. The telegraph came to Fayetteville in 1860, strung along the Military Road from St. Louis, Missouri, to Little Rock.

Civil War and Reconstruction

During the American Civil War, the Union General Samuel Ryan Curtis occupied Fayetteville on February 18, 1862,  and the following week, the Battle of Pea Ridge took place northeast of Fayetteville. The city housed wounded soldiers from the Battle of Prairie Grove in December 1862, and housed injured troops on Dickson Street. Confederate troops besieged Union soldiers in Fayetteville on April 18, 1863, at the present-day intersection of College Avenue (U.S. Route 71B) and Dickson Street, and at their headquarters. Union soldiers held the city against cannon fire and cavalry attacks, although their headquarters sustained damage. The building was restored and is operated as the Headquarters House, a museum of the Washington County Historical Society. Fayetteville was occupied from December 1862 until May 1865 (except May–September 1863) by the First Arkansas Union Cavalry, a regiment of Union men from Northwest Arkansas. Union forces repelled a Confederate attack in October 1864. After the war, the United States government established the Fayetteville National Cemetery in 1867. A cemetery for Confederate dead was founded in 1873.

Newspapers were established early; in 1859, Elias Cornelius Boudinot, a young half-Cherokee attorney, and James Pettigrew founded The Arkansan. The Fayetteville Weekly Democrat began publishing in 1868. It later developed as the Northwest Arkansas Times, and is still in print today. The Fayetteville Schools District was founded on March 20, 1871, as the first independent school district in Arkansas. The public school system was established by the Reconstruction era legislature; before the war, all education was private. Arkansas had struggled with a state banking crisis, resulting in the illegality of banking until 1868. Following the reinstatement, the Stark Bank became the first bank in the state in 1872, becoming the William McIlroy Bank four years later. This institution remains today as Arvest Bank.

School integration
In 1954, a few days after Charleston, Fayetteville was the second school district in the southern United States to implement school integration in response to Brown v. Board of Education.

Geography

Topography

Fayetteville is located in the Boston Mountains, a subset of The Ozarks which runs through Northwest Arkansas, southern Missouri, and Eastern Oklahoma. The rocks of the Boston Mountains were formed when sandstones and shales were deposited on top of the Springfield Plateau during the Pennsylvanian Period. In the Fayetteville area, following uplift during the Ouachita orogeny, the sediments were eroded to expose the Mississippian limestone formations of the Springfield Plateau, while south of Fayetteville the remaining deeply eroded Pennsylvanian sediments form the steep Boston Mountains.

Fayetteville is also the namesake of the Fayetteville Shale, a geological formation which has recently become an epicenter for natural gas extraction by hydraulic fracturing.

Metropolitan area
The city is centrally located in Washington County, Arkansas, along Interstate 49/US Route 71. This is the only fully controlled access route through the area, which replaced the winding US 71 (now US 71B) in the 1990s. An interstate connection with Fort Smith to the south and Kansas City, Missouri, to the north has contributed to Fayetteville's growth. Within Washington County, Fayetteville is bordered along the north by Springdale and Johnson. At times, this transition is seamlessly urban. Fayetteville is not bordered to its south, instead opening up to scenic country along the Boston Mountains Scenic Loop. Past the rural communities of Greenland and West Fork is Devil's Den State Park. To the west is Farmington along US Route 62 and to the east is undeveloped land in rural Washington County.

The Fayetteville–Springdale–Rogers Metropolitan Area consists of three Arkansas counties: Benton, Madison, and Washington. The area had a population of 347,045 at the 2000 census which had increased to 463,204 by the 2010 Census (an increase of 33.47 per cent). Although the Metropolitan Statistical Area does not consist of the usual principal-city-with-suburbs geography, Fayetteville's adjacent communities include Elkins, Farmington, Greenland, Habberton, Johnson, and Wyman.

Districts

Fayetteville is entirely contained within Fayetteville Township, as the township and city have identical boundaries. Although Arkansas generally does not use its civil townships for any governmental purpose, they are used for voting boundaries in some places.

Generally the part of Fayetteville west of I-49/US 71 is called west Fayetteville. Another prominent district is Uptown Fayetteville, which encompasses the scores of business and new homes near the Northwest Arkansas Mall in north Fayetteville. The University of Arkansas defines its own part of Fayetteville, with dozens of student apartments and restaurants located near campus. The University's impact is also apparent along College Avenue, which contains hundreds of shops and restaurants. Northeast of campus are the Wilson Park Historic District and the Mount Nord Historic District. The Fayetteville Historic Square is the original city center of Fayetteville, and Dickson Street is the best-known entertainment district in Arkansas. Homes atop Mount Sequoyah in the eastern part of the city encircle Mount Sequoyah Retreat and Conference Center. Old structures are also located along the former Butterfield Overland Mail route, a stagecoach route to San Francisco, California, now known as Old Wire Road. Fifteenth Street forms the southernmost residential district of Fayetteville, with the Fayetteville Industrial Park to its east.

Annexed communities
Fayetteville has annexed six unincorporated communities within its current corporate limits. Four of them are still listed as "populated places" by the USGS Board on Geographic Names. The other 2 are listed as "historical populated places." Annexations since 1870 are displayed on Fayetteville's website in the interactive maps section. Fayetteville's second annexations took place in 1946 when it incorporated Fayette Junction and McNair into the city. Baldwin was added the following year, with Barbara and Ruckers Grove being annexed in 1967. Fayetteville's most recent annexation occurred in 1982 when White Rock was added to the city limits.

Climate
Fayetteville has a humid subtropical climate (Köppen Cfa).  Fayetteville experiences all four seasons and does receive cold air masses from the north; however, some of the Arctic masses are blocked by the higher elevations of the Ozarks.

Temperatures above  are rare but do occur, on average, 3 times a year. Highs below  occur on average 10.4 times a year, with 0.6 nights per year dropping below .

Precipitation is weakly seasonal, with a bimodal pattern: wet seasons in the spring and fall, and relatively drier summers and winters, but some rain in all months.  The spring wet season is more pronounced than fall, with the highest rainfall in May.  This differs slightly from the climate in central Arkansas, where the fall wet season is more comparable to spring.

Demographics

Fayetteville is the second most populated city in Arkansas. In the 2010 census, Fayetteville had a population of 73,580 and grew by 26.8 percent from the year 2000.

2020 census

As of the 2020 United States census, there were 93,949 people, 36,705 households, and 16,703 families residing in the city.

2010 census
As of the census of 2010, there were 73,580 people, 33,661 households, and 14,574 families residing in the city. The racial makeup of the city was 89.8% White, 6.0% Black or African American, 0.8% Native American, 1.1% Asian, 0.2% Pacific Islander, 2.8% from other races, and 3.1% from two or more races. 6.4% of the population were Hispanic or Latino of any race.

Fayetteville was the third best educated city in Arkansas (after Maumelle) in the 2010 Census, proportionately, with 40.5% of adults age 25 or older holding an associate degree or higher, and 24.6% of adults possessing a bachelor's degree or higher.

There were 33,661 households, out of which 19.9% had children under the age of 18 living with them, 31.4% were married couples living together, 7.1% had a female householder with no spouse present, and 58.7% were non-families. 45.2% of all households were made up of individuals, and 7.1% had someone living alone who was 65 years of age or older. The average household size was 2.04 and the average family size was 3.02.

In the city, the population was spread out, with 16.9% under the age of 18, 23.6% from 18 to 24, 31.5% from 25 to 44, 19.3% from 45 to 64, and 8.4% who were 65 years of age or older. The median age was 27.8 years. For every 100 females, there were 100.9 males.

The median income for a household in the city was $31,393, and the median income for a family was $62,258. Males had a median income of $42,004 versus $29,373 for females, indicating a huge income disparity. The per capita income for the city was $26,267. 38.7% of the population and 26.9% of families were below the poverty line. Out of the total population, 19.0% of those under the age of 18 and 17.3% of those 65 and older were living below the poverty line.

69.6% of Fayetteville's population describes themselves as religious, above the national average of 48.34%. 50.8% of people in Fayetteville who describe themselves as having a religion are Baptist (37.22% of the city's total population). 15.5% of people holding a religion are Catholic (7.7% of the city's total population). There are also higher proportions of Methodists and Pentecostals above the national average.

Economy

Walmart is based in nearby Bentonville, Arkansas, and is one of six Fortune 500 corporations based in the state (the others being Dillard's, J.B. Hunt, Murphy Oil, Tyson Foods, and Windstream). Tyson Foods is based in Springdale, Arkansas, which is adjacent to the north of Fayetteville. Despite not being based in Fayetteville, these corporations have a big impact through the University of Arkansas. The Sam M. Walton College of Business (named for Sam Walton) at the University has received numerous donations from the Walton family. Tyson also has a presence on campus at the Tyson Center for Excellence in Poultry Science, which holds classes for the Dale Bumpers College of Agricultural, Food and Life Sciences. The poultry science program at Arkansas is one of the Top 5 programs in the United States. Transportation company J. B. Hunt is based in Lowell, Arkansas. It has donated millions of dollars to the university's logistics program, including $10 million funding the J.B. Hunt Center for Academic Excellence that completed in 2010.

The University of Arkansas has also been changing into a research-centered university since the late-20th century. The university's stated goals now include becoming the economic engine for the region, the state of Arkansas, and beyond. This focus on innovation has helped draw students who were interested in research to Fayetteville. This shift in emphasis was recognized by the Carnegie Foundation for the Advancement of Teaching with classification in the category of "R1, Highest Research Activity," in 2011.

In 2016, the City of Fayetteville announced its intention to become "The Startup City of the South" and work on further development of the entrepreneurial ecosystem. This endeavor is fostered through support from the University of Arkansas and non-profit initiatives such as the Walton Family Foundation and Community Venture Foundation.

Arts and culture

Fayetteville's culture is a combination of a Southern city, college town, and the fast-growing Northwest Arkansas metro area.

Fayetteville shares many of the characteristics commonly given to Arkansas as a Southern state, yet it has also absorbed cultural influence from the Mid and South West. Located in the mid-South, Fayetteville's culture is distinct and it differs from the southeastern portion of the state and other Southeastern Conference college towns, areas more commonly associated with the Deep South. Many of the city's first settlers came from Mid South states like Kentucky and Tennessee, who found the Ozarks similar to the Appalachian Mountains back home. The uplands of Arkansas, including the Fayetteville area, did not participate in large-scale plantation farming with slaves like the Arkansas Delta, instead electing to settle in small clusters, relying largely on subsistence agriculture and hunting rather than the settlement patterns common in the Midwest and Deep South. The hillbilly stereotype given to the Ozarks and Appalachians is largely a derivative of the difficult topography, poor quality or absent formal education, and mostly cashless self-sustaining economy found in those regions. Fayetteville's large proportion of Southern Baptist and Methodist adherents reflect the trend often associated with the Deep South.

The city also derives a cultural identity from the University of Arkansas, exhibiting many trademarks of a college town such as a prominent arts and music scene, socially-progressive residents, an emphasis on supporting local businesses, and a community focus on environmental sustainability. Fayetteville also shares a passion for collegiate athletics similar to many other Southeastern Conference member institution cities, such as Oxford, Mississippi, and College Station, Texas. The University itself is a great magnet for fresh faces and young professionals from all across the nation and the world. Fall 2017 enrollment reports indicate that 55% of U of A students were from Arkansas, 40% from out of state, and the remaining 5% from foreign countries.

Fayetteville has a strong BBQ tradition, and the majority of the city's BBQ joints serve Memphis-style barbecue, with some Texas influence. Fayetteville is also home to a diverse array of dining options as Thai, Vietnamese, and Cajun eateries can be found throughout the city's commercial districts. The Fayetteville Roots Festival, an annual celebration of local cuisine and music, only adds to the growing foodie culture of Northwest Arkansas with its community celebrations in the historic Fayetteville Square.

University of Arkansas

The University of Arkansas is Fayetteville's biggest attraction, with influence in the social, economic and educational aspects of Fayetteville.  As the state's flagship university, U of A has become integrated with Fayetteville and vice versa. Currently ranked the #135th best university in the country,  the University of Arkansas Campus Historic District listed on the National Register of Historic Places contains  and 25 buildings within a park-like arboretum. In autumn, hundreds of parents travel to Fayetteville to help their children move into the various residence halls and apartments in the area, with thousands more attending Razorback football home games. Fans return for basketball games to pack Bud Walton Arena, which was the fifth-largest on-campus arena upon completion. In spring the Hogs baseball team can be seen in Baum Stadium, named one of the top college baseball facilities in the South by Rivals.com in 2010 due to the use of a large donation by the Walton family.Senior Walk is a  sidewalk record of every graduate from the University of Arkansas. It spans nearly the entire sidewalk network in the core of the campus.

During the last decade, the university has drawn a large influx of students from bordering states, largely due to the New Arkansan Non-Resident Tuition Award scholarship program. As of Spring 2018, nearly 40% of the student population is made up of students hailing from outside of Arkansas. As a result, student-centered off-campus apartments communities are being rapidly built to accommodate the growing student population.

Dickson Street

Dickson Street is the primary entertainment district in the region, including musical and stage performances, shopping, bars, and restaurants. The West Dickson Street Commercial Historic District includes several blocks along its namesake street as well as a few blocks of West Avenue lined with unique shops, restaurants and bars. Adjacent to the University of Arkansas campus, several of Dickson Street's establishments cater to students and locals alike. The district has been enjoying a rejuvenation that began in the 1980s by Dickson Street merchants who had watched the street turn into a dilapidated, crime-filled area. Many businesses had relocated onto College Avenue, leaving Dickson Street empty and in disrepair. The steady improvements by local entrepreneurs during this time lured the Walton Arts Center, today Arkansas's premier center for arts and entertainment, to locate on Dickson Street, a decision that proved beneficial to all parties involved.

The Walton Arts Center is the result of a joint effort between the City of Fayetteville and the University of Arkansas to bring arts to the city. The center is located on Dickson Street halfway between the University and the town square. It currently features a full Broadway theatre season, arts camps, continuing education opportunities for teachers of the arts, University-sponsored performances in addition to serving as a host for community events. A considerable donation from the namesake Walton family assisted greatly in the construction of the building.

TheatreSquared, Northwest Arkansas's only year-round professional regional theatre, is located just off Dickson Street, with an annual audience of 40,000 patrons including 18,500 students reached through outreach programs. The theatre was recognized in 2011 by the American Theatre Wing as one of the nation's ten most promising emerging theatres. Dickson Street is also home to George's Majestic Lounge, the oldest live music venue in Arkansas and one of the oldest bar and concert venues in the Midwest. Opened by George Pappas in 1927, George's was the first bar in the state to integrate in the late 1950s, and began hosting live concerts in the 1970s.

Fayetteville Square

The Fayetteville Historic Square has been the center of Fayetteville since the county's first courthouse was located there in 1829. The area is surrounded by wide sidewalks, landscaped gardens, and one-way streets. The Square plays host to a variety of events, including First Thursday on the Square, the Block Street Block Party, the Lights of the Ozarks Festival, Last Night Fayetteville, and Fayetteville Farmer's Market. Containing boutiques, restaurants, music venues, museums, condos, the visitor center, and a convention center, the Square is constituted of both historic structures and new constructions.

The farmers' market began in 1974 and runs 7am to 1pm from the first Saturday in April through the last Saturday before Thanksgiving set in the Fayetteville Historic Square. Over 60 vendors provide locally grown fruits and vegetables in addition to crafts, flower bouquets, music and art, making the Fayetteville Farmers' Market very diverse. Upon receiving a grant in 2011, the Fayetteville Farmers' Market now accepts electronic benefit transfer (EBT) and food stamps. The market has been praised by the Farmers Market Coalition for its formatting which allows farmers to interact directly with customers and also empowering each vendor with a vote before making major changes in market policy. The farmers' market moves to the Botanical Garden of the Ozarks for Sunday mornings with 20–30 vendors, with some vendors also choosing to attend the Mill District Farmer's Market on Thursday evenings.

The Fayetteville Public Library, founded in 1916, was relocated in October 2004 into a $23 million building, which was the first "green" building in Arkansas. The Blair Library was awarded the 2005 Thomson Gale Library Journal Honorable Mention Library of the Year award, and, as a testament to its popularity, has seen its popularity increase, with twice as many items checked out in 2005 than in 1997. The library includes a local coffeeshop, Arsaga's, and hosts several events, including film festivals, book signings, and public forums throughout the year.

Historic districts and properties

Fayetteville contains 40 listings on the National Register of Historic Places (NRHP), the official federal list of districts, sites, buildings, structures, and objects deemed worthy of preservation. The University of Arkansas Campus Historic District constitutes the historic core of the UA campus. Residential historic districts with historically and architecturally significant contributions to Fayetteville include the Mount Nord Historic District, Washington-Willow Historic District, and Wilson Park Historic District. The Square is anchored by five NRHP structures; the original Fayetteville post office built in 1911, the Old Bank of Fayetteville Building, the Lewis Brothers Building constructed in 1908, the Mrs. Young Building built in 1887, and the Guisinger Building. The former Washington County Courthouse and Old Washington County Jail are located one block east of the Square.

The Headquarters House served as a command post in the city for both the Union and Confederacy during the Civil War, and today serves as a museum. The Fayetteville National Cemetery is also listed on the NRHP. Built in 1867 following the Civil War, the cemetery has been expanded from its original 1,800 interments to over 7,000 interments.

Fayetteville was the first home of Bill and Hillary Clinton while they both taught law at the University of Arkansas School of Law. The house where they were married and lived is now the Clinton House Museum highlighting his early political life and features campaign memorabilia, a replica of Hillary's wedding dress, a photo gallery, and footage from his early campaign commercials.

Sports

Fayetteville does not host any professional sports teams, allowing the Arkansas Razorbacks to control the sports scene. The Razorbacks (sometimes referred to as Hogs) are frequently referred to as "The State of Arkansas's Professional Team". The Razorbacks compete in the National Collegiate Athletic Association's Division I and the Southeastern Conference.

Donald W. Reynolds Razorback Stadium plays host to the Arkansas Razorbacks football team, usually hosting 6–7 home football games each season. One game is scheduled yearly at War Memorial Stadium in Little Rock, Arkansas, although there has been discussion of moving these games to Fayetteville in recent years. Some major high school football games in the state are played in Razorback Stadium as well. Bud Walton Arena is home to the Arkansas men's and women's basketball teams. This facility was built in 1993 and holds a capacity of 19,368. Arkansas volleyball plays in Barnhill Arena in addition to the Razorbacks gymnastics team, also on the campus of the University of Arkansas. The Arkansas Razorbacks baseball team plays in Baum Stadium at George Cole Field, one of the nation's top 25 college baseball facilities. Softball plays in the newly built Bogle Park on campus.

Due to the success of Arkansas's track and cross country teams, Fayetteville is sometimes called the "Track Capital of the South". The city has hosted the National Collegiate Athletic Association (NCAA) Division I Indoor Track and Field Championships at the Randal Tyson Track Center, one of the world's fastest surfaces. Arkansas also has hosted the Outdoor Track and Field Championships track facility at John McDonnell Field, named the "Top Outdoor Track and Field Facility of the Year" by the American Sports Builders Association in 2002.

The Blessings golf course is a golf course located along Clear Creek in Fayetteville designed by Robert Trent Jones Jr. It is said to be one of the most difficult and strangely designed golf courses in the U.S. The course is home to the University of Arkansas Razorbacks golf teams.

The Northwest Arkansas Naturals Baseball Club are the (AA) minor league affiliate of the Kansas City Royals Baseball Club in Major League Baseball. The club plays at Arvest Ballpark, located in nearby Springdale.

The 2022 UCI Cyclo-cross World Championships was held in Fayetteville.

Parks and recreation

The Fayetteville Parks and Recreation Department maintains 70 parks whose total land area makes up .  The National Wildlife Federation has listed many parks and trails in Fayetteville as Certified Wildlife Habitats, which provide food, water, shelter, and a nurturing environment for young wildlife. A favorite park in Fayetteville is Wilson Park, which anchors the Wilson Park Historic District. The park was the city's first, and today contains a swimming pool, two playgrounds, a baseball field, picnic areas, and a 1981 castle in addition to courts for volleyball, basketball and tennis. The National Register of Historic Places-listed historic district encompasses 47 homes constructed in the late 19th and early 20th century along the southern edge of the park.

A new addition to the Fayetteville parks scene is the Botanical Garden of the Ozarks. First envisioned in 1993, the Botanical Garden Society of the Ozarks raised funds for the facility until beginning construction in 2003. Planned to be built in three stages, the first stage has been completed and includes a visitor center, cafe, and garden gateway. Stage one also includes one-third of the total planned gardens and half the maintenance facilities.

Fayetteville takes pride in its trail system, and has been named a Bicycle Friendly Community by the League of American Bicyclists since 2010. Trails in Fayetteville are well-marked with signs along the route in addition to road crossings. The city maintains trails within the city limits and segments of inter-city trails such as the Razorback Regional Greenway.

It crosses the namesake creek six times on arching steel bridges and also uses a  tunnel, at one time the only pedestrian tunnel in Arkansas. A trail of  named the Dickson Street/U of A loop links around the campus of the University of Arkansas and ends at the corner of Dickson Street and College Avenue. Approximately  are added to the system per year.

Government

Mayor–city council
Fayetteville operates within the mayor–city council form of government. The mayor is elected by a citywide election to serve as the Chief Executive Officer (CEO) of the city by presiding over all city functions, policies, rules and laws. Once elected, the mayor also allocates duties to city employees. The Fayetteville mayoral election in coincidence with the election of the President of the United States. Mayors serve four-year terms and can serve unlimited terms. The city council is the unicameral legislative of the City, consisting of eight aldermen. Also included in the council's duties is balancing the city's budget and passing ordinances. The body also controls the representatives of specialized city commissions underneath their jurisdiction. Two aldermen are elected from each of the city's four wards.

Citizen boards, commissions, and committees
Citizen input is welcomed through the use of various specialized groups. Although some positions are appointed by the mayor, many consist of volunteers. Requirements include the applicant is a resident of Fayetteville and submission of an application in order to gain access to any of Fayetteville's 28 city boards. These range from appointed positions at the Northwest Arkansas Regional Planning Commission to the Fayetteville Arts Council to the Fayetteville Public Library Board of Trustees to the Historic District Commission and the Tree and Landscape Advisory Committee.

Judicial system

The Fayetteville District Court is located at 176 S Church Avenue in downtown Fayetteville, and is presided over by the District Judge, who is elected in a citywide election. The court handles criminal, civil, small claims, and traffic matters within the city limits. Beyond city court, Fayetteville is under the jurisdiction of the Fayetteville Department of Washington County District Court. Currently, the Washington County District Court is a Local District Court, meaning it is presided over by part-time judges who may privately practice law. The court will become a State District Court, meaning it will be presided over by a full-time judge in 2017. Superseding that jurisdiction is the 4th Judicial Circuit Court, which covers Washington and Madison counties. The Circuit Court contains seven circuit judges.

Politics
The current mayor is Lioneld Jordan, first elected in 2008, again in 2012, again in 2016, and most recently in 2020. Prior to entering government, Jordan worked in the Facilities Management Department at the University of Arkansas for 27 years.

The current state representatives that serve districts containing portions of Fayetteville are Rep. Nicole Clowney, Rep. David Whitaker, Rep. Denise Garner. The current state senators that serve districts containing portions of Fayetteville are Sen. Greg Leding and Sen. Lance Eads.

Education

Most of Fayetteville is served by the Fayetteville Public Schools system, which consists of eight elementary schools, four intermediate schools, two special schools, and Fayetteville High School. The district was established in 1871 as the oldest school district in Arkansas. Fayetteville High School has been recognized by Newsweek as one of the South's top 500 high schools based on Advanced Placement (AP) courses as well as AP test scores. The school's student literary magazine and athletics programs have also received regional praise. Sections of Fayetteville are zoned to Farmington School District (operating Farmington High School), Greenland School District (operating Greenland High School), and Springdale School District; In 2006 the portion of Fayetteville in the Springdale district was divided between the zones of Har-Ber and Springdale high schools.

Fayetteville is also home of public charter school Haas Hall Academy, independent of all of the public school districts. Although Haas Hall Academy is located in Fayetteville, the school serves students across Arkansas. Haas Hall was established in 2004 as the first open-enrollment public charter high school in Arkansas. The school has been recognized by Newsweek as the best school in Arkansas and 147th best school in the nation. The nearest Catholic high school is Ozark Catholic Academy in Tontitown.

The University of Arkansas was founded in Fayetteville in 1871 as Arkansas Industrial University. The land-grant/space-grant, high-activity research institution is the flagship campus of the University of Arkansas System. Enrollment for the 2010 fall semester was 21,406 total students. Approximately 84% are Arkansas natives, with about 2% being international students due to the general lack of diversity in the region. Although it offers over 200 degree choices (excluding doctorate fields), the university is noted for its above average architecture, history, creative writing, poultry science, and business programs. Because of the University of Arkansas's large presence in many aspects of the city's economy, culture, and lifestyle, Fayetteville is often portrayed as a college town with elements of dominance by the Walmart Corporation.

Media

The Fayetteville market is defined as Washington and Benton Counties and is also called the Northwest Arkansas market by Arbitron. This two-county area was ranked 127th in the nation with a listening/viewing population (age 12+) of 356,900 as of Spring 2011.

Radio
Two stations are operated by the University of Arkansas, KXUA 88.3 FM, which is the student-run station and KUAF, 91.3 FM, a national public radio (NPR) station.
Cumulus Media owns seven stations in the Northwest Arkansas market, KFAY 1030 AM (news talk), KYNG 1590 AM, KQSM-FM 92.1 FM (ESPN Radio), KAMO-FM 94.3 FM (classic country music), KRMW 94.9 FM, KKEG 98.3 FM (classic rock), and KMCK-FM 105.7 FM (Top 40). IHeartMedia owns four radio stations in the area, including KIGL 93.3 FM (classic rock), KMXF 101.9 FM (Top 40), KKIX 103.9 FM (country music) and KEZA 107.9 FM (adult contemporary). Hog Radio, Inc. owns three radio stations in the area, including KAKS 99.5 FM (an ESPN Radio affiliate), KFMD-FM 101.5 (Hot AC), and KXRD 96.7 FM (country music). Butler Communications owns KXNA 104.9 FM (new rock), KREB 1190 AM, and KFFK 1930 AM. Kerm, Inc. operates two News Talk Information stations: KURM 790 AM and KLTK 1140 AM. KSEC 95.7 broadcasts in the Mexican Regional format and KFFK 1390 AM of Butler Communications broadcasts in the Spanish News/Talk format. Religious stations include KAYH 89.3 FM, KBNV 90.1 FM, and KLRC 90.9 FM. All sports radio station KUOA 1290 AM is rebroadcast on 105.3 in Fayetteville and features Arkansas Razorbacks coverage. KISR 95.9 FM is translated to Fayetteville from Fort Smith. Smaller operations include KPBI 1250 AM (news talk information) and KBVA 106.5 FM (Classic Hits/Oldies/Adult Standards/Adult Contemporary). Fayetteville Community Radio, The Public Square, KPSQ 97.3 FM, operates via a low-power license granted by the FCC.

Local TV stations
Fayetteville is part of the Fort Smith/Fayetteville television market, which is currently the 101st largest in the country. Stations include, but are not limited to:

KAFT (AETN) 13 - PBS
KFSM 5 – CBS
KFTA 24 – Fox
KHOG 29 – ABC / The CW
KNWA 51 – NBC
KXNW 34 – MyNetworkTV

Local newspapers

 Arkansas Democrat-Gazette
 The Morning News
 Northwest Arkansas Democrat Gazette (consolidation of the Northwest Arkansas Times)
 The Fayetteville Free Weekly
 Washington County Observer
 The University of Arkansas Traveler

Local online media
 Fayetteville Flyer

Infrastructure

Transportation

Major highways

 Interstate 49
 US Route 62
 US Route 71
 US Route 71 Business
 Highway 16
 Highway 45
 Highway 112
 Highway 112 Spur
 Highway 180
 Highway 265

The major through route in Fayetteville is Interstate 49/US 71. This fully controlled access, four-lane expressway is a discontinuous piece of a route ultimately planned to connect Kansas City, Missouri, to New Orleans, Louisiana. Formerly designated as Interstate 540 with the re-designation as Interstate 49 being granted by the U S Department of Transportation Federal Highway Administration on March 28, 2014, the highway became the first freeway in the area when it was completed in the 1990s to relieve the former US 71 (now US 71B) of a much-increased demand of through travelers following the unanticipated and rapid growth of the Northwest Arkansas metro. Future plans for the I-49 corridor include completion of a freeway segment through Western Arkansas to Texarkana and completion of a Bella Vista Bypass to the north.

Other major north–south routes in Fayetteville include US 71B, which was the predecessor to I-49/US 71. This route is now mostly designated College Avenue in Fayetteville and features dozens of restaurants and stores, with many aimed at the University of Arkansas student demographic. To the east of College Avenue is the oldest road in Fayetteville, Arkansas Highway 265. This route first was used by Native Americans as the Great Osage Trail, followed by Civil War troops bound for Fort Smith, Arkansas, the Trail of Tears, the Butterfield Overland Mail stagecoach route, and later still the telegraph. To the west of College Avenue is Gregg Avenue, which contains many student-oriented apartments along its shoulders and further west is Garland Avenue. This route runs along the campus of the University of Arkansas in south Fayetteville, with apartments and duplexes along its northern routing.

Public transportation
The city of Fayetteville has two major providers of public transportation. Razorback Transit is a free bus system centered on the campus of the University of Arkansas with routes to other Fayetteville destinations such as Dickson Street or the Northwest Arkansas Mall. Ozark Regional Transit runs throughout both Washington and Benton Counties and is a broader bus-based regional transit system.

Aviation
Drake Field, formerly Fayetteville Municipal Airport, is owned by the city and serves general aviation.  The nearest airport for commercial flights is Northwest Arkansas Regional Airport (XNA), located 17 miles northwest of the city, which opened in 1998. Drake Field receives many sports charters year round because of the Arkansas Razorbacks.

Utilities

The City of Fayetteville owns and operates a large water system that provides services to several municipalities and unincorporated areas in the northern half of Washington County in addition to Fayetteville residents. Drinking water is pumped in from the Beaver Water District treatment plant in Lowell. The city uses  of water per day on average.

Wastewater
Fayetteville owns its own wastewater operation, including a network of pipes and lift stations which convey wastewater to the city's two wastewater treatment plants. Both plants are operated by CH2M and regulated by the Arkansas Department of Environmental Quality (ADEQ). Historically, all sewage was sent to the Paul R. Noland Wastewater Treatment Plant (Noland WWTP) on the east side of town. However, development on the city's west side as well as the expense of pumping wastewater over East Mountain led the city to build the West Side WWTP in 2008. In addition to these two facilities, Fayetteville also operates 39 lift stations to pump wastewater over steep elevation rises in order to utilize gravity flow toward the WWTPs. Fayetteville also maintains a biosolids management program, in which biosolids, a byproduct of wastewater treatment, are land applied to provide nutrients to soil on which crops are grown.

Fayetteville's first wastewater treatment came in 1913 in the form of an Imhoff tank on the West Fork of the White River. This facility was improved several times throughout the years until the construction of the City of Fayetteville Water Pollution Control Facility downstream of Lake Sequoyah. This plant was built in 1968 and has since seen major upgrades and expansion.

The city's biosolids program was conceived after concerns about the costs and sustainability of landfill dumping arose. Fayetteville initiated a land application program on a farm site near the Noland plant that allowed the city to apply biosolids and subsequently grow and harvest hay. In 2010, solar energy became the main component of the solids dewatering process following the installation of six solar dryers. From this program, the city gains additional revenue from the sale of hay and fertilizer (Class A biosolids).

See also
 List of people from Fayetteville, Arkansas

Notes

References

See also

External links 

 
 Encyclopedia of Arkansas History & Culture entry: Fayetteville (Washington County)

 
Cities in Arkansas
Cities in Washington County, Arkansas
County seats in Arkansas
Northwest Arkansas
Populated places established in 1836
1828 establishments in Arkansas Territory